The flag of Stavropol Krai of Russia is a Nordic Cross charged with the krai's coat of arms in its centre.  The cross itself is white set on a golden background. In one version, the coat of arms is depicted entirely in gold, in correspondence to the flag's background. In another version, it is in its full array of colours.

The flag was officially adopted by the State Council of Stavropol on 15 April 1997. The proportions are 2:3 according to the second article of the law on the krai's flag.

References
Flags of the World

Flags of the federal subjects of Russia
Flags introduced in 1997